Horqin District is an administrative district of the prefecture-level city of Tongliao, Inner Mongolia, China, and its seat of government.

The district was formed in January 1999 upon the creation of the prefecture-level city of Tongliao from the former Jirem League. The boundaries of the district is roughly coterminous with the core urban area of Tongliao.

The local Mongolian dialect spoken in the area is Khorchin Mongolian; most people in the district speak Mandarin Chinese (the most commonly spoken dialect is Northeastern Mandarin).

The Inner Mongolia University for the Nationalities is located in the district; it was founded in 2000 as an amalgamation of the Inner Mongolia Normal College of the Nationalities, the Mongol Medicine College of Inner Mongolia, and the Jirem College of Animal Husbandry.

See also
Horqin Left Rear Banner

References

External links
www.xzqh.org 

County-level divisions of Inner Mongolia
Tongliao